Porvoo sub-region  is a subdivision of Uusimaa and one of the Sub-regions of Finland since 2009.

Municipalities
 Askola
 Myrskylä (Mörskom)
 Porvoo (Borgå)
 Pukkila (Buckila)

Politics
Results of the 2018 Finnish presidential election:

 Sauli Niinistö   66.1%
 Pekka Haavisto   12.5%
 Laura Huhtasaari   6.1%
 Paavo Väyrynen   4.6%
 Nils Torvalds   3.4%
 Tuula Haatainen   3.1%
 Matti Vanhanen   2.4%
 Merja Kyllönen   1.9%

Sub-regions of Finland
Geography of Uusimaa